Saifi Chaudhry (born 15 November 1929) is a Pakistani former sports shooter. He competed at the 1956 Summer Olympics and the 1960 Summer Olympics.

References

1929 births
Living people
Pakistani male sport shooters
Olympic shooters of Pakistan
Shooters at the 1956 Summer Olympics
Shooters at the 1960 Summer Olympics
Sportspeople from Sialkot
Sport shooters from Punjab, Pakistan